Manu Herbstein (born 1936) is the South African author of Ama, a Story of the Atlantic Slave Trade (2001), which won the 2002 Commonwealth Writers Prize for Best First Book, the first time the award had been given to an electronic book. The first chapter of the novel may be read on-line at the link below.

References

External links 
Companion web site, including the first chapter, which may be read online.

South African Jews
1936 births
South African writers
Living people
Place of birth missing (living people)